Summit Lake (or Upper Summit Lake) is located on Canyon Creek in the Chugach National Forest, Alaska, United States and is situated along the Seward Highway (AK-1)  north-northeast of Moose Pass and about  southwest of the Portage area of Anchorage. The lake is fed by Canyon Creek from the southwest and Tenderfoot Creek from the east. The lake empties into Canyon Creek on the northeast, which flows through Lower Summit Lake, into Six Mile Creek, and eventually into the Turnagain Arm of the Cook Inlet.

The Summit Lake Lodge is located just off the Seward Highway on the north shore of Summit Lake and the Tenderfoot Creek Campground is located directly south of the lodge, but on the east shore of the lake. A restoration of a former ski area has been proposed for the area as well, but has substantial obstacles that must be overcome before it can be rebuilt.

The lake has a natural population of both Dolly Varden and Lake trout, but is also stocked annually with fingerling Rainbow trout.

See also

 Chugach National Forest
 Moose Pass, Alaska
 Seward Highway
 Summit Lake (Alaska)—disambiguation page

References

External links
 Summit Lodge (official website)
 Chugach National Forest (official U.S. Forest Service webpage)

Lakes of Alaska
Lakes of Kenai Peninsula Borough, Alaska